Wassen is a surname. Notable people with the surname include:

Christina Wassen (born 1999), German diver
Elena Wassen (born 2000), German competitive diver
Rogier Wassen (born 1976), Dutch tennis player

See also
Lassen
Wassén (surname)